Khosrov III the Small (Khosrov III Kotak; Kotak means "little, short, small") was the king of Arsacid Armenia .

Khosrov was the son and successor of King Tiridates III. Khosrov received the epithet Kotak because he was a man of short stature. He was the namesake of his paternal grandfather Khosrov II of Armenia, and the Parthian and Armenian monarchs of this name (see Khosrau).

Armenia fell into chaos after the death of Tiridates III. An Arsacid prince named Sanatruk (whom Faustus of Byzantium calls Sanesan, king of Maskut, and identifies as Khosrov's brother) raised a rebellion to take the throne. In the southwest, the bdeashkh of Arzanene Bakur revolted against the Arsacid monarchy with the support of the Sasanian king Shapur II. The anti-Persian faction in Armenia led by Patriarch Vrtanes I crowned Khosrov king with the help of Constantine the Great. Khosrov crushed Bakur's rebellion and retook Arzanene and Armenian Mesopotamia. He then made peace with Sasanian Iran by agreeing to pay a yearly tribute to the Persians. Khosrov also exterminated two feuding princely houses in Armenia, the Ordunis and the Manavazians, and seized their lands.

After the departure of the Roman legions from Armenia, Sanatruk invaded Armenia at the incitement of Shapur II with an army of various Caucasian mercenaries and invaded Ayrarat, the central province of the kingdom. Sanatruk took the city of Vagharshapat and forced Khosrov and Vrtanes to flee westward to Kogovit. Forces loyal to Khosrov rallied under Sparapet Vache Mamikonian and destroyed Sanatruk's army in a surprise attack, killing the pretender in a battle near Oshakan. Khosrov rewarded his top generals Vache Mamikonian and Vahan Amatuni and the other nakharars that had remained loyal to him with land and other lavish gifts. After this, the country enjoyed a period of peace, and Khosrov occupied himself with building his new capital city of Dvin. He also founded two large hunting grounds in Ayrarat called Khosrovakert and Tachar Mayri. The Khosrov Forest State Reserve in modern-day Armenia is named after him.

In 337, Shapur II's army laid siege to Nisibis, while one of his generals marched against central Armenia. A nakharar named Databe Bznuni was tasked with organizing the defense, but instead passed over to the Sasanian side. Vache Mamikonian and Vahan Amatuni led the Armenian army to victory against the Persian invaders in a battle near the southeastern coast of Lake Van. Databe Bznuni was executed; his house was annihilated and their holdings were seized by the king. After this, Khosrov decreed that all nakharars with a force larger than 1,000 soldiers were obligated to live at the royal court, where the king could exercise control over them. Khosrov broke off relations with Sasanian Iran and moved Armenia closer to the Roman Empire. Shapur soon invaded Armenia again but was repulsed at great cost to the Armenian defenders. Sparapet Vache Mamikonian and many other great lords were killed in battle. Khosrov died in 338/339 in Dvin. His remains were interred in the Arsacid royal mausoleum in Ani. He was succeeded by his son, Tiran.

Khosrov had three children: a son, Tiran, who succeeded him as king; a daughter, Varazdukht, who married Pap, the son of Patriarch Husik; and another daughter, Bambishn, who married the second son of Husik, Atanagenes, with whom she had Nerses, the future Patriarch of Armenia.

References

Notes

Citations

Sources

See also
 Dvin
 Khosrov State Reserve

4th-century kings of Armenia
Roman client kings of Armenia
339 deaths
Year of birth unknown
City founders
History of Dvin
Arsacid kings of Armenia